The men's welterweight event was part of the boxing programme at the 1936 Summer Olympics. The weight class was the fourth-heaviest contested, and allowed boxers of up to 147 pounds (66.7 kilograms). The competition was held from Monday, August 10, 1936 to Saturday, August 15, 1936. Twenty-four boxers from 24 nations competed.

Medalists

Results

References

External links
Official Olympic Report
 

Welterweight